The Abbey of the Holy Cross in Cañon City, Colorado, is a former monastery of the Order of St. Benedict in the United States. It existed for nearly 120 years, operating such various enterprises as a boarding school for boys and a winery. It is listed on the National Register of Historical Places.

History

Expansion
Two Benedictine monks were sent in 1886 from St. Vincent Archabbey in Latrobe, Pennsylvania, and traveled to Breckenridge, Colorado, to establish a monastic community in what was still frontier territory. They went at the invitation of Joseph Projectus Machebeuf, then still the Vicar Apostolic for Colorado and Utah. Their first foundation was the Priory of St. Mary in Boulder. Other monks followed in ensuing years.

The growth of the community led the community to move to Cañon City in 1924, where a larger monastery was built in the Gothic Revival style. The house was raised to the status of an abbey at that time, and it assumed a new name. A boarding school was opened at the abbey, and initial attempts were made at establishing a winery, which were not pursued at the time.

Like other religious communities in the United States, the abbey saw its numbers prosper during the 1950s and 1960s, only to see a steep decline begin after that. The abbey school was closed in 1985.

By the early 2000s, the community was composed of about 20 monks, mostly elderly. In an effort to find a means of income for themselves, in the year 2000 the monks decided to return to the idea of planting a vineyard again. They entrusted the production to a professional viticulturist who began to produce wine the following year.

Decline
By the year 2005, however, it was determined that the monastic community was no longer viable and, in a final chapter meeting, the monks voted to dissolve it. They found homes for themselves in various other monasteries, and the abbey was closed the following year in september of 2006.

Winery at Holy Cross Abbey 
The winery and tasting room opened to the public in 2002, welcoming visitors to its beautiful and serene Rocky Mountain vineyard.

The Winery at Holy Cross Abbey invites visitors into its tasting room where staff guide them through a flight tasting on award-winning wine. Additional services include a VIP wine and cheese tasting during the summer months. The tasting room also sells world and locally-made goods.

In the spring and summer, visitors may sit in an outdoor garden setting while viewing thriving vineyards growing against the backdrop of the Rocky Mountains. In the winter, visitors may taste wine beside a roaring fireplace.

Annual Events 
The Winery at Holy Cross Abbey hosts and participates in several annual events. These include but are not limited to:

 Harvest Festival
 Winemakers Dinner
 Farmmm to Table Fun Run and Dinner
 Palette to Palate
 Spring Wine Extravaganza

Wines

 Monterey Chardonnay
 Cabernet Sauvignon
 2015 Wild Cañon Harvest
 Sauvignon Blanc Reserve
 Cabernet Sauvignon Reserve
 Apple Blossom
 Syrah
 Revelation
 American Riesling
 Merlot
 Cabernet Franc
 Merlot Divinity
 Merlot Reserve
 Sangre de Cristo Nouveau
 Vineyard Sunset

References

External links
SAH Archipedia Building Entry

Religious organizations established in 1886
1886 establishments in Colorado
2005 disestablishments in Colorado
19th-century Christian monasteries
Catholic Church in Colorado
Churches on the National Register of Historic Places in Colorado
National Register of Historic Places in Fremont County, Colorado
Churches in Fremont County, Colorado
Buildings and structures in Cañon City, Colorado
19th-century Roman Catholic church buildings in the United States
20th-century Roman Catholic church buildings in the United States